Mark William Irwin (10 February 1935 – 30 June 2018) was a New Zealand rugby union player. He played 25 matches for the All Blacks including seven internationals.

Born in Gisborne, Irwin was educated at Wanganui Collegiate School where he was head boy, and played in the 1st XV rugby team from 1950 to 1952. He went on to study medicine at the University of Otago, graduating MB ChB in 1961. An accomplished rower, Irwin was in the eight nominated to represent New Zealand at the 1956 Summer Olympics in Melbourne; however, the crew did not make final selection.

In his medical career, Irwin worked in Rotorua for over 40 years as a general practitioner and anaesthetist.

Irwin died in Rotorua on 30 June 2018, aged 83.

References

1935 births
2018 deaths
Rugby union players from Gisborne, New Zealand
People educated at Whanganui Collegiate School
University of Otago alumni
New Zealand rugby union players
New Zealand international rugby union players
Otago rugby union players
Poverty Bay rugby union players
Bay of Plenty rugby union players
Rugby union props
New Zealand male rowers